Essex is a town in Chittenden County, Vermont, United States. Vermont Route 289 crosses the town from east to west. The city of Essex Junction, population 22,094, was located within the town as an incorporated village until 2022.

History

The town was incorporated on June 7, 1763, named after the Earl of Essex.

The Village of Essex Junction was formed—within the town of Essex—on November 15, 1892. The village was formed to provide services (such as sidewalks, water, and sewers) to the villagers that the rest of the, mostly rural, town citizens did not want, and did not want to pay for.

As the town outside the village developed, they gradually added similar services for themselves, and by 1958, the first hints of merger showed up in a voter petition. Since then a series of votes (often contentious) had defeated or passed merger in each community, but never at the same time in both (which was required by the state legislature for them to sign off on the merger).

This temporarily changed on November 7, 2006, when merger passed in the town as a whole, and in the village. The town as a whole (including the village) got to vote once on the merger, and the village, separately, got to vote in a second ballot to accept the merger if it passed the townwide vote. This was confusing enough that the regional paper misreported the results as a defeat of the merger, based solely on the vote results outside the village. The next day the correct results were reported in both the town's paper, and as a correction in the regional paper.

On December 6, 2006, a petition to reconsider the merger was submitted to the town. The petition contained signatures totaling more than 5 percent of registered voters, which is the threshold required to force a re-vote. The revote was held on January 23, 2007, with a result that overturned the merger by 191 votes, rejecting the current merger proposal.

If the results had stood, a multi-year merger process would have resulted in a new "Town of Essex Junction" replacing the current governments of the town of Essex and the village of Essex Junction.

On 2 November, 2021 voters in the village of Essex Junction did vote to separate from the town of Essex, citing an unfair tax burden. The vote was 3,070 to 411 in favor of separation. Essex Junction separated on 1 July, 2022.

Geography
Essex is located in central Chittenden County, bordered on the south by the Winooski River. Neighboring municipalities are Colchester to the west, Milton at the northwest corner, Westford to the north, Underhill at the northeast corner, Jericho to the east, Williston to the south, and the cities of South Burlington and Essex Junction to the southwest.

The 575 acre Indian Brook Town Conservation Area and 335 acre Saxon Hill Town Forest are located within the town.

Demographics

2010 census 
As of the census of 2010, there were 19,587 people and 7,322 households in the town. The racial makeup of the town was 91.6% non-Hispanic White, 1.5% Black or African American, 3.2% Asian, 0.3% Native American, 0.1% other races, and 1.8% from two or more races. Hispanic or Latino of any race made up 1.7% of the population. The population density was 534 people per square mile (184.4/km2). There were 7,013 households, out of which 38.5% had children under the age of 18 living with them, 59.7% were married couples living together, 8.8% had a female householder with no husband present, and 28.5% were non-families. 21.7% of all households were made up of individuals, and 5.5% had someone living alone who was 65 years of age or older. The average household size was 2.62 and the average family size was 3.09.

In the town, the age distribution of the population shows 27.9% under the age of 18, 6.8% from 18 to 24, 32.5% from 25 to 44, 24.6% from 45 to 64, and 8.2% who were 65 years of age or older.  The median age was 36 years. For every 100 females, there were 97.4 males.  For every 100 females age 18 and over, there were 94.8 males.

The median income for a household in the town was $58,441, and the median income for a family was $65,794. Males had a median income of $45,428 versus $27,426 for females. The per capita income for the town was $25,854.  About 1.8% of families and 2.6% of the population were below the poverty line, including 2.4% of those under age 18 and 6.6% of those age 65 or over.

Arts and culture

Museums and other points of interest
The Harriet Farnsworth Powell Museum is located in Essex. The museum is housed in a former two-room schoolhouse, and includes a collection of costumes, school items, and local memorabilia.

Government

Until 2022, Essex comprised three Vermont Legislature districts (seats) within Chittenden County: District 8–1, the central portion of the town of Essex; District 8–2, the former village of Essex Junction; and District 8–3, northern town of Essex and the town of Westford. The town of Essex and the city of Essex Junction will continue to share municipal services until July 1st, 2023.

Education

The Essex Westford School District (EWSD)—unified on July 1, 2017—serves 4,500 Pre-K to grade 12 students in Essex, Essex Junction, and Westford, Vermont. EWSD operates ten schools in the two towns—Albert D. Lawton Intermediate School, Essex Center for Technology, Essex Elementary School, Essex High School (EHS), Essex Middle School, Founders Memorial School, Hiawatha Elementary School, Summit Street School, Thomas Fleming School, and Westford School. Previously, the three communities had separate Pre-K to grade 8 school districts that fed the already unified EHS.

EWSD provides busing for students in Essex and Westford, as well as students in Essex Junction, who did not have buses prior to 2018. EWSD also provides busing to students from South Hero, Grand Isle, North Hero and Georgia who choose to attend EHS.

Media
The Essex Reporter is a weekly newspaper published in town, covering news in Essex and the surrounding communities in Chittenden County. It has a weekly circulation of 8,800 copies.

Infrastructure

Transportation
Vermont's Circumferential Highway (Vermont Route 289 or "The Circ") courses through Essex, and the section within Essex's jurisdiction has been completed. However, further construction of the highway was halted in surrounding communities by court action from environmental protesters.

Bus service is provided by Green Mountain Transit.

Rail

Amtrak, the national rail passenger system, provides daily service via its station in neighboring Essex Junction, operating the Vermonter train between St. Albans, Vermont and Washington, D.C. In 2008, a study indicated that the cheapest method for one person to get to New York City from the Burlington area was by train, at $48. It was also the longest, taking an estimated 9 hours and 25 minutes.

Notable people 

 Bert Abbey (1869–1962), pitcher with the Washington Senators, Chicago Colts, and Brooklyn Grooms/Bridegrooms
 William B. Castle, mayor of Cleveland, Ohio
 Linda K. Myers, member of the Vermont House of Representatives

See also
 Essex Junction, Vermont

References

External links
 

 Town of Essex official website
 City-Data.com
 ePodunk: Profile for Essex, Vermont

 
Towns in Vermont
Burlington, Vermont metropolitan area
Towns in Chittenden County, Vermont